The Stratford tube crash occurred on 8 April 1953, on the Central line of the London Underground.  12 people died and 46 were injured as a result of a rear-end collision in a tunnel, caused by driver error after a signal failure. This was the worst accident involving trains on the London Underground until the Moorgate tube crash in 1975. A similar accident at exactly the same location, with less serious consequences, occurred in 1946, before the line was open for public traffic; one railwayman died. 

A memorial plaque to the accident was unveiled at Stratford Station on 8 April 2016 by Lyn Brown, Member of Parliament for  West Ham. Members of the families of those killed in the crash were also in attendance along with  Mike Brown, Commissioner of Transport for London.

Collision
A signal (A491) in the tunnel between Stratford and Leyton had been damaged, and this and the preceding signal (A489) were showing a permanent red aspect. However, one train collided with the back of another which was waiting at signal A491, and the first and second coaches of the colliding train were partially telescoped.

Investigation
The driver claimed to have been travelling slowly and that his vision had been obscured by a cloud of dust, but it was felt his memory could have been affected by concussion.

References
 Railways Archive account, including official Accident Report
 Railways Archive account and Accident Report of 1946 accident

Disasters on the London Underground
Railway accidents in 1953
1953 disasters in the United Kingdom
1953 in London
Stratford, London
April 1953 events in the United Kingdom
History of the London Borough of Newham
Train collisions in England
Rail accidents caused by a driver's error